Michael White (born 8 January 1987) is a Welsh-born New Zealand footballer, currently playing for ASB Premiership side Canterbury United FC.

Career 
White started his football with Richmond Athletic and
played for Canterbury United during the 2005-06 NZFC season, he can play in various midfield and attacking roles. 
He joined Australian A-League side New Zealand Knights in 2006, before joining Waitakere United for the remainder of the NZFC season.  In mid-2007 he moved to his place of birth, Wales, and joined Rhyl FC in the Welsh Premier League, finishing Top Goal Scorer.

2009 found him back in New Zealand and playing for Central Premier League side Miramar Rangers, winning the 2010 Chatham Cup. He joined Youngheart Manawatu for the 2010–2011 season. After another season with Miramar Rangers in the Central Premier League, he joined Team Wellington. With a move back to the South Island, he transferred from Team Wellington to Canterbury United for the remainder of the season 2011/2012 season. Signed for Nelson Suburbs in the Mainland League.

International 
White played for the New Zealand U-17, New Zealand U-20 national teams and New Zealand A-Team that toured Vietnam in 2006.

Personal 
White and his partner Jamee have three daughters. Maddie, Harlow and Willow.

References

External links
Michael White Welsh Premier career stats

1987 births
Living people
New Zealand association footballers
A-League Men players
New Zealand Knights FC players
Waitakere United players
Canterbury United players
Miramar Rangers AFC players
Association football midfielders
Association football forwards